Kannibal Kapers is a 1935 short animated film by Columbia Pictures featuring the comic strip character Krazy Kat.

Plot
Krazy is riding away at sea on a life ring, perhaps from a ship that sunk. His life ring suddenly catches a large fish which promptly hurls him onto a tree on the shore. On that tree a spidermonkey picks up and places him on a platter which is then carried away by a cannibal chef. The cannibal chef carries Krazy to the chief of the cannibal tribe. The cannibal chief, however, finds Krazy not having enough flesh, and therefore refuses to eat him. The wife of the chief comes by and develops affection for him.

To treat the cannibal couple for sparing his life, Krazy decides to entertain them by dancing and being the conductor of their orchestra. Krazy then conducts, and the orchestra is performing in a more upbeat fashion. The performance goes as planned until Krazy is approached by a cannibal woman who seems to be bothered by the music. When Krazy does not notice her, the woman kicks him. The kick sends Krazy airborne onto much of the orchestra who are most disturbed. The musicians gang on him but Krazy is able to escape. But while he runs, a double bass player grabs and shoots Krazy like an arrow projected by a bow. The cartoon ends with Krazy falling back into the sea.

Reception
National Exhibitor (Jan 3, 1936): "Krazy, as a castaway, lands on an island inhabited by savages who run a night club, "Coconut Grove". In the absence of any interesting plot Mintz has savages run through various dance forms and the hot-cha orchestra displays the versatility with instruments that only a cartoon will allow. Result so-so."

Motion Picture Review Digest (June 10, 1936): "This pictures the feline on a cannibal isle, embellished with a Cocoanut Grove, where night club entertainment is in vogue. It is poorly done and not recommended."

See also
 Krazy Kat filmography

References

External links
Kannibal Kapers at the Big Cartoon Database

1935 short films
American animated short films
American black-and-white films
1935 animated films
Krazy Kat shorts
Columbia Pictures short films
1930s American animated films
Columbia Pictures animated short films
Screen Gems short films